Phostria obscurata is a moth of the family Crambidae described by Frederic Moore in 1885. It is found in Taiwan, India, Sri Lanka, Singapore and Myanmar.

Adults are purplish brown. The forewings have an extremely indistinct blackish transverse outwardly curved narrow antemedial band, and an irregular postmedial band. There is a spot in the middle of the cell, and a streak at the end. The hindwings have a similar irregular discal band.

References

Moths described in 1885
Phostria
Moths of Asia